Vladyslav Kostyantynovych Klochan (born 31 May 1998) is a Ukrainian professional footballer who plays as a defensive midfielder for Ukrainian club Bukovyna Chernivtsi.

References

External links
 Profile on Bukovyna Chernivtsi official website
 

1998 births
Living people
Sportspeople from Kherson Oblast
Ukrainian footballers
Association football midfielders
FC Dnipro players
FC Oleksandriya players
FC Inhulets Petrove players
FC Zirka Kropyvnytskyi players
FC Skoruk Tomakivka players
FC Bukovyna Chernivtsi players
Ukrainian Second League players
4. Liga (Slovakia) players
Ukrainian expatriate sportspeople in Slovakia
Ukrainian expatriate footballers
Expatriate footballers in Slovakia